"Consequences" is episode fifteen of season three of the television show Buffy the Vampire Slayer. It was written by Marti Noxon, directed by Michael Gershman, and first broadcast on February 16, 1999.

Plot
Buffy dreams that she is being pulled underwater by the corpse of Deputy Mayor Allan Finch; when she manages to reach the surface, her fellow vampire slayer, Faith, pushes her back down. Faith's plan to cover up her accidental killing of the deputy mayor fails when Allan's body is recovered from the water. Wesley Wyndam-Pryce orders the slayers to investigate the death to see if anything supernatural was involved. Privately, Faith asks Buffy not to turn her in, warning Buffy that she could also get implicated. Buffy and Faith sneak into City Hall to try to find out what Allan was doing in the alleyway in the first place. They find that all of his papers have been shredded, and that the Mayor is in league with Mr. Trick.

After much thought and discussion with Willow, Buffy decides to tell Giles what happened, only to discover that Faith has already told him that Buffy was the killer. Giles easily sees through the lie, though he lets Faith think he believes her so the gang can keep closer tabs on her and get her off the slippery slope she is on. Giles tells Buffy that accidental human deaths do occur in the fight against vampires, and that Faith is in denial about the killing. Wesley overhears the conversation and calls the Watcher Council.

While offering to help, Xander reveals to the gang that he slept with Faith. Willow tries to play down her reaction but ends up crying alone in the bathroom. Buffy expresses her worry about Faith and the need to deal with the problem now.

Xander tries to reason with Faith, but she throws him on the bed, teasing she could do anything she wanted to him, and proceeds to strangle him. Angel bursts in and clobbers her with a bat, then tries his own brand of reasoning and seems to be making progress. The mayor and Trick watch Buffy and Faith's City Hall break-in on CCTV. The mayor says that the Slayers both have to be taken care of and quickly as there is not enough evidence to put them in jail.

Helped by others with crosses and nets, Wesley attacks Angel and shackles Faith for transport to the Watcher Council in England. She quickly escapes, and plans to hop a boat out of Sunnydale. On his return to the library, a bruised Wesley receives a very hostile reception from the gang. Buffy finds Faith and tries to reason with her but Faith challenges Buffy to join her side instead, eventually inciting Buffy to hit her. Their confrontation is interrupted by several vampires led by Trick. As he is about to bite Buffy, Faith stakes him. Buffy returns to the library, convinced that there is still good in Faith. In the final scene Faith approaches the mayor and offers to replace Trick as his assistant.

Reception
Noel Murray of The A.V. Club said "Consequences" was necessary to progress the story arc, but "doesn't really work as a stand-alone episode".

References

External links

 

Buffy the Vampire Slayer (season 3) episodes
1999 American television episodes
Television episodes written by Marti Noxon